L'Aurore boréale is a Canadian bi-weekly newspaper, published in Whitehorse, Yukon. Established in 1983, the newspaper serves the Franco-Yukonnais community.  Its title is the French translation of Aurora Borealis.

External links
 L'Aurore boréale

Newspapers published in Yukon
Mass media in Whitehorse
French-language newspapers published in Canada
Weekly newspapers published in Canada
Publications established in 1983